The 1999 Speedway Grand Prix of Denmark was the sixth and last race of the 1999 Speedway Grand Prix season. It took place on 25 September in the Speedway Center in Vojens, Denmark

Starting positions draw 

The Speedway Grand Prix Commission nominated British rider Mark Loram and a Jesper B. Jensen as Wild Card.

Heat details

The intermediate classification

See also 
 Speedway Grand Prix
 List of Speedway Grand Prix riders

References

External links 
 FIM-live.com
 SpeedwayWorld.tv

D
Speedway Grand Prix
1999